The Díaz Type C, (C standing for Caccia - "fighter") was a Spanish fighter prototype in the late 1910s. It competed in the Concurso de Aviones in 1919.

Development
The Type C was based on a 1917 design by Julio Adaro which was never completed. The aircraft itself was a two-bay equi-span biplane powered by a 180 hp Hispano-Suiza engine.

Operational history
The Type C failed to qualify in the Concurso de Aviones in April 1919 at Cuatro Vientos as it did not meet the requirements set out by the specification from the Spanish Aviación Militar's fighter contest. The contest was later won by the Hispano Barrón. Only one was ever produced. Very little data for the Type C have survived.

Specifications

References

 

1910s Spanish fighter aircraft
Aircraft first flown in 1919